Joe or Joseph English may refer to:

Joe English (loyalist), former Ulster loyalist activist
Joe English (musician) (born 1949), American musician
Joe English (painter) (1882–1918), Flemish draughtsman and painter
Joe English (sailor), (1956–2014), Irish Yachtsman
Joseph English (athlete), British middle-distance runner
Joseph English (architect) (died 1927), Australian architect with the firm English and Soward
Joseph Craig English, American artist